Darker than Black: Gemini of the Meteor is a Japanese anime series directed and written by Tensai Okamura and produced by Bones. It is a sequel to the 2007 series Darker than Black with most of the crew returning for production duties. The series was broadcast on MBS, TBS and their affiliated stations from October 8 to December 24, 2009.October 9 to December 25, 2009. The sequel tells of Suo Pavlichenko, a Eurasian girl whose life is changed by a frightful incident regarding a meteor shower, and her subsequent encounter with the assassin Hei, who is still on the run from the Syndicate two years after the events in the previous season.

The series was released on both DVD and Blu-ray by Aniplex in Japan; beginning from December 23, 2009 with an estimated eight volumes with the final one released on July 21, 2010. Each odd-numbered volume contains two series episodes, while an OVA episode known as Darker than Black: Gaiden was released along with one series episode in each even-numbered volume. Altogether four OVA episodes, they are side-stories of the main characters Hei and his partner Yin, with the events set in between both seasons as Hei's backstory is explained while dealing with the awakening of the latter's alter-ego.

On July 2, 2010, Funimation announced at Anime Expo 2010 that they had licensed the second season. Funimation released the series on DVD/Blu-ray on November 8, 2011. Funimation's rights to the second season expired in 2018. Manga Entertainment released the series in the United Kingdom as a single compilation, while Madman Entertainment licensed it in Australia. The OVAs were included in the Gemini of the Meteor compilation.

The opening theme  is sung by the Japanese rock band Stereopony, while the ending theme "From Dusk Till Dawn" is performed by Abingdon Boys School, who previously did the first opening theme for Darker than Black: Kuro no Keiyakusha.


Episode list

Home media release
Aniplex

North America

Notes

References

Episodes
Darker than Black
Darker than Black